Ganbaataryn Tögsbayar (born on 13 May 1985) is a Mongolian footballer, who plays as a striker for Selenge Press in Mongolia. He is a member and the second top goalscorer of the Mongolia national football team.

References

1985 births
Living people
Mongolian footballers
Mongolia international footballers
Erchim players
Khoromkhon players
Association football forwards